Charles-François-Adrien Macret (2 May 1751, Abbeville - 24 December 1783, Paris) was a French designer and engraver. His works were signed, variously, as Macret, Carolus Macret, C. Macret and C.F. Macret.

Biography 
He was the second of seven children born to Jean-Baptiste Macret, a soapmaker, and his wife, Marie-Charlotte. His older sister, Marie-Anne-Françoise-Charlotte, married the painter, Pierre-Adrien Choquet (1743-1813). His youngest brother, also became an engraver. His father died in 1772, when he fell into a soapmaking vat and was fatally scalded.

He began his artistic education at the age of thirteen, when he was apprenticed to a metal engraver named Joseph Selik, originally from Hanover, who specialized in heraldry. It was from this first artisanal experience that he made contact with the Parisian engravers, Nicolas-Gabriel Dupuis and Claude-Antoine Littrey de Montigny (c.1735-1775). After their deaths, he continued his studies with Jacques-Philippe Le Bas, Jacques Aliamet and Augustin de Saint-Aubin. He appears to have had a special relationship with Saint-Aubin, who allowed him to take joint credit on several works.

In 1777, he married Marie-Julie Petit and they had three children.  

According to his brother-in-law, Choquet, he was always thin, delicate and sickly. He died of a persistent fever, perhaps aggravated by overwork, aged only thirty-two. What he intended to be his masterwork, a depiction of the Siege of Beauvais (1472), was left unfinished, along with several smaller works.

References

Further reading 
 Roger Portalis and Henri Béraldi, Les graveurs du XVIIIe siècle, Vol.2, Damascène Morgand et Charles Fatout, 1881.
 Émile Delignières, Les graveurs abbevillois, Douillet, Amiens, 1888. 
 Émile Delignières, Conférence sur les graveurs abbevillois au musée d'Abbeville et du Ponthieu, le 30 juin 1893, H. Delesques, Caen, 1896.

External links

1751 births
1783 deaths
French engravers
People from Abbeville